Lyons Tea may refer to:
 Lyons Tea (Ireland), brand of tea originating in Dublin and sold in Ireland
 J. Lyons and Co., British company known for its Lyons Tea Shops